Takla Landing Water Aerodrome  is located on Takla Lake in the Takla Lake Marine Provincial Park, British Columbia, Canada.

See also
Takla Narrows Aerodrome

References

Seaplane bases in British Columbia
Regional District of Bulkley-Nechako
Registered aerodromes in British Columbia